Goundara is a village and principal settlement (chef-lieu) of the commune of Kontela in the Cercle of Bafoulabé in the Kayes Region of southwestern Mali.

References

Populated places in Kayes Region